The Emerald Pacific Airlines is an aviation company of Taiwan.

History
The company was founded in November 1994. In 1998, the company made a contract with Taiwan Power Company (Taipower) for overhead power line insulator cleaning works.

Services

The company operates in the area of aerial photography, agricultural chemical spraying, disaster relief, overhead power line insulator cleaning, construction rigging and loading etc.

Accidents and incidents
 On 22 November 2015, an Emerald Pacific Airlines Bell 206B helicopter crashed during Taipower overhead power line insulator cleaning in Taishan District, New Taipei killing two people on board.

See also
 List of companies of Taiwan

References

External links
 

1994 establishments in Taiwan
Airlines established in 1994
Airlines of Taiwan